Paretak  is a village in the municipality of Kiseljak, Bosnia and Herzegovina. It was the site of several skirmishes during the Bosnian War.

Demographics 
According to the 2013 census, its population was 152.

References

Populated places in Kiseljak